R280 may refer to:

R280 road, a regional road in County Leitrim, Ireland
A variant of the Mercedes-Benz R-Class car